The Takeda Foundation, is an organisation based in Japan.  In 2001 it launched an annual awards program, which presented awards accompanied by 100 million yen under the categories social/economic well-being, individual/humanity well-being, and world environmental well-being.

Winners 
Awardees within each category are listed in alphabetical order.

2001

Social/Economic Well-Being 
The technical achievement honored by the Takeda Award 2001 Techno-Entrepreneurial Achievements for Social/Economic Well-Being was "the origination and the advancement of open development models for system software - open architecture, free software and open source software."

Individual/Humanity Well-Being 
The technical achievement honored by the Takeda Award 2001 Techno-Entrepreneurial Achievements for Individual/Humanity Well-Being was "development of a large-scale genome sequencing system by establishing 'the whole genome shotgun strategy' that utilizes modularized data acquisition system and high-throughput DNA sequencers."

World/Environmental Well-Being 
The technical achievement honored by the Takeda Award 2001 Techno-Entrepreneurial Achievements for World Environmental Well-Being is "the development and promotion of the Ecological Rucksacks and Material Input per Unit Service (MIPS) concepts, as measures of the ecological stress of products and services." 

The awards were suspended in 2003 due to financial constraints, with the hope that they could be restarted if/when the Takeda Foundation's financial situation improves.

As well as the above awards, also in 2001 and 2002 they presented the Techno-Entrepreurship Award, and the Takeda Scholarship Award.

2002

Social/Economic Well-Being

Individual/Humanity Well-Being

World/Environmental Well-Being

See also

 List of environmental awards

Resources
Takeda Foundation

References

Awards established in 2001
Environmental awards
Humanitarian and service awards
Japanese science and technology awards